Kumbakonam (formerly spelt as Coombaconum or Combaconum) or Kudanthai is a city municipal corporation in the Thanjavur district in the Indian state of Tamil Nadu. It is the second largest city in the district after Thanjavur. The city is bounded by two rivers, the Kaveri River to the north and Arasalar River to the south. Kumbakonam is known as a "Temple town" due to the prevalence of a number of temples here and is noted for its Mahamaham festival, which happens once in 12 years, attracting people from all over the country.

Kumbakonam dates back to the Sangam period and was ruled by the Early Cholas, Pallavas, Mutharaiyar dynasty, Medieval Cholas, Later Cholas, Pandyas, the Vijayanagara Empire, Madurai Nayaks, Thanjavur Nayaks and the Thanjavur Marathas. It rose to be a prominent town between the seventh and ninth centuries AD, when it served as a capital of the Medieval Cholas. The city reached the zenith of its prosperity during the British Raj when it was a prominent centre of European education and Hindu culture; and it acquired the cultural name, the "Cambridge of South India". In 1866, Kumbakonam was officially constituted as a municipality, which today comprises 48 wards, making it the second largest local civil body in Thanjavur district. It became a municipal corporation on 24 August 2021.

Etymology 
The name "Kumbakonam", roughly translated in English as the "Pot's Corner", is believed to be an allusion to the mythical pot (kumbha) of the Hindu god Brahma that contained the seed of all living beings on earth. The kumbha is believed to have been displaced by a pralaya (dissolution of the universe) and ultimately came to rest at the spot where the town of Kumbakonam now stands. This event is now commemorated in the Mahamaham festival held every 12 years. Kumbakonam is also known as Baskarashetram and Kumbam from time immemorial and as Kudanthai in ancient times. Kumbakonam is also spelt as Coombaconum in the records of British India. Kumbakonam was also formerly known by the Tamil name of Kudamukku. Kumbakonam is also identified with the Sangam age settlement of Kudavayil.

History

The region around Kumbakonam was inhabited as early as the Sangam Age (third century BC to third century AD). The present-day Kumbakonam is believed to be the site of the ancient town of Kudavayil where the Early Chola king Karikala held his court. Some scholars identify Kumbakonam as the site of the fabled prison of Kudavayir-kottam where the Chera king Kanaikkal Irumporai was imprisoned by the Early Chola king Kocengannan. Kumbakonam is identified with the town of Malaikūrram which had served as the Chola capital as early as the seventh century and with the town of Solamaligai which had also served as a Chola capital. According to the Sinnamanur plates, Kumbakonam was the site of a battle between the Pallava king Sri Vallabha and the then Pandya king in 859 and between the Pandya king Srimara Pandya and a confederacy of the Cholas and Gangas.

Kumbakonam came into the limelight during the rule of the Medieval Cholas who ruled from the ninth century to the twelfth century.  The town of Pazhaiyaarai,  from Kumbakonam was the capital of the Chola Empire in the ninth century.

Following the decline of the Chola kingdom, Kumbakonam was conquered by the Pandyas in 1290.
Following the demise of the Pandya kingdom in the 14th century, Kumbakonam was conquered by the Vijayanagar Empire. Krishnadevaraya (1509–29), the emperor of Vijayanagara visited the town in 1524 and is believed to have bathed in the famous Mahamaham tank during the Mahamaham festival. Kumbakonam was ruled by the Madurai Nayaks and the Thanjavur Nayaks from 1535 to 1673 when it fell to the Marathas. Each of these dynasties had a considerable impact on the demographics and culture of the region. When the Vijayanagar Empire fell in 1565, there was a mass influx of poets, musicians and cultural artists from the kingdom.

According to the chronicles of the Hindu monastic institution, the Kanchi matha, the matha was temporarily transferred to Kumbakonam in the 1780s following an invasion of Kanchipuram by Hyder Ali of Mysore. When Tipu Sultan invaded the east coast of South India in 1784, Kumbakonam bore the brunt of his invasion. The produce fell sharply and the economy collapsed. Kumbakonam did not recover from the calamity until the beginning of the 19th century.
Kumbakonam was eventually ceded to the British East India Company in 1799 by the Thanjavur Maratha ruler Serfoji II (1777–1832) and reached the zenith of its prosperity in the late 19th and early 20th century when it emerged as an important center of Brahminism, Hindu religion and European education in the Madras Presidency. The opening of the Suez Canal in 1869 fostered trade contacts with the United Kingdom. In 1877, railway lines were completed linking Kumbakonam with the ports of Madras, Tuticorin and Nagapattinam. The Tanjore district court was established in Kumbakonam in 1806 and functioned from 1806 to 1863.

Kumbakonam continued to grow even after India's independence though it fell behind the nearby town of Thanjavur in terms of population and administrative importance. The population growth rate began to fall sharply after 1981. This decline has been attributed to limited land area and lack of industrial potential. However the peripheral areas of Kumbakonam population increased as evident from the successive census data. During the Mahamaham festival of 1992, there was a major stampede in which 48 people were killed and 74 were injured. On 16 July 2004, a devastating fire accident in the Sri Krishna school killed 94 children.

Geography

It lies in the region called the "Old delta" which comprises the north-western taluks of Thanjavur district that have been naturally irrigated by the waters of the Cauvery and its tributaries for centuries in contrast to the "New Delta" comprising the southern taluks that were brought under irrigation by the construction of the Grand Anicut canal and the Vadavar canal in 1934. It has an average elevation of 26 metres (85 ft). The town is bounded by two rivers, the Cauvery River on the north and Arasalar River on the south.

Although the Cauvery delta is usually hot, the climate of Kumbakonam and other surrounding towns is generally healthy and moderate. Kumbakonam is cooler than Chennai, the capital of Tamil Nadu. Kumbakonam receives an annual rainfall of  every year. The region is covered with mainly alluvial or black soil which is conducive for rice cultivation. Other crops grown in Kumbakonam include mulberry, cereals and sugarcane.

The town of Kumbakonam is surrounded by extensive paddy fields. Methods of irrigation were considerably improved following the opening of the Mettur Dam in 1934. The fauna of the Cauvery Delta is limited to cattle and goats. The town is situated at the western flank of the Kumbakonam-Shiyali ridge which runs along the Kollidam river basin separating the Ariyalur-Puducherry depression from the Nagapattinam depression. This granular ridge projects further eastwards penetrating the Puducherry depression and forms a hard layer of cretaceous rock underneath the sedimentary top soil.

Demographics

According to 2011 census, Kumbakonam had a population of 140,156 with a sex-ratio of 1,021 females for every 1,000 males, much above the national average of 929. A total of 12,791 were under the age of six, constituting 6,495 males and 6,296 females. The average literacy of the town was 83.21%, compared to the national average of 72.99%. There were a total of 9,519 workers, comprising 32 cultivators, 83 main agricultural labourers, 1,206 in house hold industries, 7,169 other workers, 1,029 marginal workers, 24 marginal cultivators, 45 marginal agricultural labourers, 212 marginal workers in household industries and 0 other marginal workers.

Kumbakonam has a strong Hindu majority; but it also has sizeable Muslim and Christian populations. Among Hindus, Vanniyars, Kallars, Brahmins and Dalits are the numerically dominant Tamil-speaking groups. Brahmins are more numerous and affluent in Kumbakonam than in other parts of Tamil Nadu. There are also large populations of Moopanars, Konars and Nadars.  Amongst Muslims, the Sunnis are dominant. However, there is also a significant Shia minority. Most of the Muslims are Marakkayars or Labbays. The majority of Muslims in Kumbakonam are involved in commerce or maritime trade. Kumbakonam also has a large population of Protestant Christians largely due to the efforts of the German missionary Christian Friedrich Schwarz.  The Catholics in Kumbakonam are mainly affiliated to the Roman Catholic Diocese of Kumbakonam which was separated from the Archdiocese of Pondicherry in 1899.

The population of Kumbakonam is predominantly Tamil-speaking. The commonly used dialects is the Central Tamil dialect. There are significant minorities speaking Thanjavur Marathi, Telugu, Kannada and Saurashtra as their mother tongue.

Residential areas make up 32.09% of the town's total area while commercial enterprises and industrial units make up 2.75% and 1.21%, respectively. The non-urban portion of the town constitutes about 44.72% of the total area. Kumbakonam has a total of 45 slums with a population of 49,117.

As per the religious census of 2011, Kumbakonam had 86.07% Hindus, 9.57% Muslims, 3.99% Christians, 0.% Sikhs, 0.% Buddhists, 0.23% Jains, 0.13% following other religions and 0.% following no religion or did not indicate any religious preference.

Administration and Politics

Municipal Corporation 

The Kumbakonam municipality was officially constituted in the year 1866. It comprises 48 wards and is the biggest municipality in Thanjavur district.

The functions of the municipality are devolved into six departments: General, Engineering, Revenue, Public Health, Town planning and the Computer Wing. All these departments are under the control of a Municipal Commissioner who is the supreme executive head. The legislative powers are vested in a body of 48 members, one each from each of the 48 wards. The legislative body is headed by an elected chairperson who is assisted by a deputy chairperson.

Politics 
Kumbakonam is a part of the Kumbakonam Legislative Assembly constituency and elects a member to the Tamil Nadu Legislative Assembly once every five years. Despite being a hub of militant Communism in the 1950s, Kumbakonam voted for the Indian National Congress in the first five state elections held between 1952 and 1977. The Dravida Munnetra Kazhagam won the elections in 1977 and between 1977 and 1989, the seat was alternatively held by the Dravida Munnetra Kazhagam, All India Anna Dravida Munnetra Kazhagam or the Indian National Congress. Since 1989, barring an interregnum of five years between 1991 and 1996, the seat has been held by Ko. Si. Mani of the Dravida Munnetra Kazhagam. Kumbakonam was a part of the Kumbakonam Lok Sabha constituency from 1952 until 1977, when the constituency was disbanded. The assembly segments in the erstwhile Kumbakonam Lok Sabha constituency were included in the Mayiladuthurai Lok Sabha constituency and have remained so ever since.

Law Enforcement
Law and order in Kumbakonam in maintained by the Thanjavur sub division of the Tamil Nadu Police headed by a Deputy Superintendent of Police (DSP). There are four police stations in the town, one of them being an all-women police station. There are special units like prohibition enforcement, district crime, social justice and human rights, district crime records and special branch that operate at the district level police division headed by a Superintendent of Police (SP). Suburban localities are under the jurisdiction of Swamimalai, Patteswarm, Nachiyarkovil, Tiruvidamarudhur, Thiruneelakudi police stations. Recently government has established one police station at Cholapuram by reorganizing kumbakonam Taluk, Swamimali and Thirupanandal Police station

Economy

The important products of Kumbakonam include brass, bronze, copper and pewter vessels, silk and cotton cloths, sugar, indigo and pottery. Kumbakonam is considered to be the chief commercial centre for the Thanjavur region. In 1991, around 30% of the population was engaged in economic activity. Rice production is an important activity in Kumbakonam.  Of 194 industrial units in Kumbakonam, 57 are rice and flour mills. Kumbakonam is also a leading producer of betel leaves and nuts; the betel leaves produced in Kumbakonam are ranked amongst the best in the world in terms of quality. The A. R. R. Agencies, a leading manufacturer of arecanut slices has its factory in Kumbakonam. The main administrative offices of T. S. R. & Co., a cosmetic company, are also based in Kumbakonam. Kumbakonam is also famous for its metal works. The Tamil Nadu Handicraft Development Corporation had been established in the nearby town of Swamimalai in order to train bronze artisans. Kumbakonam is an important silk-weaving centre and more than 5,000 families were employed either directly or indirectly in silk weaving. Silk weaved in Kumbakonam is regarded as one of the finest in the subcontinent. They are largely used in the manufacture of Thirubuvanam silk sarees. Kumbakonam was also an important salt-manufacturing area during British rule. The town lends its name to the Kumbakonam Degree Coffee, a blend of coffee prepared using undiluted pure milk. In recent times, Kumbakonam has emerged as an important manufacturer of fertilizers.

Apart from its manufactures, tourism is also a major source of income for the town. Many Lodges and resorts from budget to high end category are functioning in kumbakonam. The Hindu temples and colonial-era buildings have been recognised for their tourism potential. The 12th-century Airavatesvara Temple in the town of Darasuram near Kumbakonam is an UNESCO World Heritage Site. Kumbakonam is also frequented by art collectors interested in handloom cloth and other curios. Banks such as the Axis Bank, Bank of Baroda, IDBI Bank, State Bank of India, Tamilnad Mercantile Bank, Canara Bank, Indian Bank, Indian Overseas Bank, Bank of India, Union Bank of India, Corporation Bank, Lakshmi Vilas Bank, ICICI Bank, ING Vysya Bank, Karur Vysya Bank, Punjab National Bank, Syndicate Bank and Vijaya Bank have their branches in Kumbakonam.  The City Union Bank was founded in Kumbakonam in 1904 as the Kumbakonam Bank Limited and it is headquartered in the town.

Utility services

Electricity supply to Kumbakonam is regulated and distributed by the Kumbakonam circle of Tamil Nadu Electricity Board (TNEB). Power Substations are existing viz. Kumabakonam Urban 33/11 kV SS at Rajan Thottam, Kumbakonam Township (Nagariyam) 110 kV at Needamangalm Road, 110 kV SS at Sakottai and Patteswaram 230/110 kV. Water supply is provided by the Kumbakonam municipality from Cauvery river and Coleroon river; the distribution is managed through head works located at Valayapettai and Kudithangi, supplying  of water to the town. About  of solid waste is collected from the town everyday; 53% domestic wastes and 32% commercial wastes. The collected wastes are dumped in yards outside the town and segregated to produce organic manure. Kumbakonam municipality has partial underground drainage connectivity and the municipality is implementing the underground drainage to the uncovered areas. The major sewerage system for disposal of sullage is through septic tanks and public conveniences. Roadside drains carry untreated sewage out of the town to let out raw into the sea or accumulate in a low-lying area.

Kumbakonam comes under the Cauvery River Delta Area (CRDA) of the Bharat Sanchar Nigam Limited (BSNL), India's state-owned telecom and internet services provider. Apart from telecom, BSNL also provides broadband internet service. Kumbakonam hosts the district headquarters hospital, Thanjavur District at Kumbakonam and Coronation municipal hospital, Melakaveri Urban Primary health centre, 34 private hospitals & clinics and numerous medical shops catering to the healthcare need of the town.

Landmarks

Temples

Kumbakonam is known for its temples and mathas (monasteries). There are around 188 Hindu temples within the municipal limits of Kumbakonam. Apart from these, there several thousand temples around the town thereby giving the town the sobriquets "Temple Town" and "City of temples".

Adi Kumbeswarar Temple is considered to be the oldest Shaiva (the sect of the god Shiva) shrine in the town, believed to be constructed by the Cholas in the seventh century. The Nageswaraswamy Temple has a separate shrine for the Sun god Surya who is believed to have worshipped Shiva at this place. Adi Kumbeswarar temple, Nageswaraswamy temple and Kasi Viswanathar temple are Shiva temples in the town revered in the Tevaram, a Tamil Shaiva canonical work of the seventh to eighth century. Kumbakonam has one of the few temples dedicated to the god Brahma.

Sarangapani temple is the largest Vaishnava (the sect of the god Vishnu) shrine present in Kumbakonam. The present structure of the temple having a twelve storey high tower was constructed by Nayak kings in the 15th century. It is one of the "Divya Desams", the 108 temples of Vishnu revered by the 12 Alvar saint-poets. The Ramaswamy temple, which has scenes from the Hindu epic Ramayana depicted on its walls, was constructed by Govinda Dikshitar, the minister of successive Nayak rulers, Achuthappa Nayak (1560–1614) and Raghunatha Nayak (1600–34). He added a commercial corridor between the temple and the older Chakrapani temple, which in modern times is called Chinna Kadai Veethi, a commercial street in the town. Pilgrims from all parts of India take a holy dip once every 12 years during the Mahamaham festival in the Mahamaham tank. Over 40 lakh pilgrims participated in the festival during the 2016 event which is also known as the Southern Kumbha mela. Govinda Dikshitar constructed the sixteen mandapams (shrines) and stone steps around this tank.

Kumbakonam also has a number of mathas. The Sri Sankara matha of Kanchipuram was moved to Kumbakonam during the reign of Pratap Singh (1739–63) and remained in Kumbakonam until the 1960s. There are also two Vellalar mathas in the nearby towns of Dharmapuram and Thiruppanandal and a Raghavendra matha in Kumbakonam. There is also a branch of the Vaishnava Ahobila mutt in Kumbakonam.

The Thenupuriswarar Temple at Patteeswaram, the Oppiliappan Kovil and the Swamimalai Murugan temple are located in the vicinity of Kumbakonam. The Airavatesvara Temple in Darasuram locality of Kumbakonam built by Rajaraja Chola II (1146–73) during 12th century is a UNESCO World Heritage Site, along with the Brihadeeswara Temple at Thanjavur and the Gangaikondacholisvaram Temple at Gangaikonda Cholapuram that are collectively referred as the Great Living Chola Temples.

Transport 

Kumbakonam is connected by road and rail. The National highway NH-36 connects Vikravandi - Manamadurai, passes through this town. Over 87% of the municipal roads are paved. There are regular government and private bus services to Chennai, Thanjavur, Mannargudi, Tiruchirapalli, Chidambaram, Thiruvarur, Mayiladuthurai, Nagapattinam, Coimbatore, Tiruppur, Palani, Thoothukudi, Rameswaram, Tiruchendur, Salem, Edapaddi, Vellore, Kumuli, Cumbum, Karaikudi, Pudukkottai, Neyveli, Madurai, Sivagangai, Thiruthuraipoondi, Pattukkottai, Muthupet, Puducherry, and Tirunelveli. The Karnataka State Road Transport Corporation (KSRTC) and State Express Transport Corporation (Tamil Nadu)(SETC) operates daily services from Bengaluru and mysuru to Kumbakonam. On 1 March 1972, the Cholan Roadways Corporation was established by the Government of Tamil Nadu with its headquarters in Kumbakonam in order to improve transportation facilities in the districts of central Tamil Nadu. The organisation acquired the fleets of buses earlier owned by private operators – Sri Ramavilas Service, Raman and Raman Limited and Sathi Vilas. On 1 July 1997, the organization was renamed Tamil Nadu State Transport Corporation, Kumbakonam and presently forms division no. 1 of the Tamil Nadu State Transport Corporation. The corporation runs a reconditioning unit and a tyre re-threading unit in Kumbakonam.

Kumbakonam is connected by rail with towns and cities in South India. The Mysuru- Mayiladuthurai Express connects Kumbakonam with Mysuru and Bengaluru. There are regular express trains that connect Kumbakonam with major cities in the state like Chennai, Coimbatore, Madurai and Tiruchirapalli. There are passenger trains that connect Kumbakonam with Thanjavur, Tiruchirapalli, Chidambaram and Mayiladuthurai. The upgrading of NH-36 from two-lane to four-line is under progress, which upon completion will greatly reduce to time of travel to Thanjavur and Chennai.

The traditional modes of transportation are bullock carts. It is recorded that as late as the 1950s, landlords and rich farmers travelled mostly by bullock carts with the exception of rare long journeys which they undertook by buses or motor vehicles. Kumbakonam has an efficient local bus transportation system. The town bus stand is located situated just opposite to the moffusil Bus Station Kumbakonam|Arignar Anna Bus Stand where the long-distance buses are stationed. There are occasional ferries that transport people and goods across the Cauvery. Till the beginning of the 20th century, students of the Government Arts College used to cross the Cauvery on coracle ferries in order to attend college. Since the construction of a bridge in 1944, the practice of transporting men and goods by coracles has greatly diminished.

Education

The Raja Veda Padasala, established by Govinda Dikshitar during 1542 in Kumbakonam, teaches Sanskrit vedic scriptures in specialised fields of Rig Veda, Yajur Veda, Sama Veda, Agamas and Sastras. Kumbakonam emerged as an important centre of education in the late 19th century and was known as the "Cambridge of South India". The Government Arts College, established in Kumbakonam in 1867, is one of the oldest educational institutions in the Madras Presidency. It began as a provincial school on 19 October 1854, before being upgraded to a government college in 1867. It was affiliated to the Madras University in 1877. One of the early principals of the college was William Archer Porter, a Cambridge Wrangler, who, along with T. Gopala Rao, was instrumental in its elevation to a government college. He is also credited with framing the college's acclaimed educational policy. In 1881, it became a full-fledged college and high school courses ceased to be taught.  Notable faculty members included U. V. Swaminatha Iyer (1855–1942) while the Indian mathematician Srinivasa Ramanujan (1887–1920) who studied from 1904 until 1906 when he dropped out and V. S. Srinivasa Sastri (1869–1946), an Indian politician and administrator, are its notable alumni. The Government Arts College for Women was started in 1963 and had a total strength of 2,597 pupils in February 2006. The college offers various undergraduate courses and one post-graduate course and is affiliated to the Bharathidasan University. Other colleges in Kumbakonam include Idhya Colleges of Arts and Sciences, Annai College of Arts and Sciences, Annai Engineering College, Mass College, Sankara Arts college, PRIST University Kumbakonam Campus, Government College Of Fine Arts and Arasu Engineering College, KSK Engineering college, As Slam Engineering college at nearby Thirumanglakudi. The Shanmugha Arts, Science, Technology & Research Academy has a satellite campus based in Kumbakonam where  disciplines of Engineering(electronics and communication Engineering & computer science Engineering), arts and sciences are taught.

The Native High School, founded in 1876, and the Town Higher Secondary School, one of whose students was Srinivasa Ramanujan, were some of the oldest schools in the Madras Presidency. At present, there a total of 36 government and private schools in Kumbakonam.

Notes

References

Further reading

External links 

 

Hindu pilgrimage sites in India
 
Cities and towns in Thanjavur district